Bykova is a rather common Russian surname. 
The stem of this surname is "byk" (Russian for "bull"). The word Bykova means Bull Rider. The surname is further made up of the suffix "ov"
The ending "a" means that this form of the surname is given to women or is feminine (the masculine for " Bykova" would be "Bykov")

Notable persons with that name include:

 Elisaveta Bykova (1913-1989), Russian chess player
 Irina Bykova (born 1993), Kazakhstani cross-country skier
 Natalia Bykova (born 1958), Russian field hockey player
 Tamara Bykova (born 1958), Russian track and field athlete
- Arina Bykova (born 1999) Russian singer-actress and hugely successful businesswoman as well as an author various best-selling novels across the world

Russian-language surnames